Edward Somerset, 4th Earl of Worcester, KG, Earl Marshal (c. 1550 – 3 March 1628) was an English aristocrat. He was an important advisor to King James I (James VI of Scots), serving as Lord Privy Seal.

He was the only son of three children born to the 3rd Earl of Worcester and Christiana North. On 21 February 1589, he succeeded his father as Earl of Worcester.

In June 1590 Worcester travelled to Edinburgh to congratulate James VI of Scotland on his safe return from Denmark and marriage to Anne of Denmark, and gave notice that the king was to join the Order of the Garter. He discussed with James rumours that English ships had lain in wait for his return. At first, he was not able to see Anne of Denmark who had toothache, and he joked that in England this would be interpreted as a sign she was pregnant. Worcester had an audience with Anne, and took her letter to Elizabeth. He was accompanied by Lord Compton who watched 'pastimes' or hunting on the sands of Leith.

In 1593 he was made a Knight of the Garter. In a letter of September 1602 he mentions that Queen Elizabeth was entertained in the Privy Chamber with country dances and Irish tunes.

In 1606 he was appointed Keeper of the Great Park, a park created for hunting by Henry VIII around Nonsuch Palace, of which Worcester Park was a part. The residence Worcester Park House was built in 1607.

Family

He married Lady Elizabeth Hastings on 16 December 1571 at Whitehall Palace in a triple wedding with Edward de Vere, 17th Earl of Oxford and bride, Anne Cecil, and Edward Sutton, 4th Baron Dudley and bride, Mary Howard. She was a daughter of Francis Hastings, 2nd Earl of Huntingdon and Catherine Pole. Catherine was a daughter of Henry Pole, 1st Baron Montagu and Jane Neville. Jane was in turn a daughter of George Nevill, 4th Baron Bergavenny and his wife Margaret, daughter of Hugh Fenn. They had fifteen children among whom were: 
William Worcester born before 20 Apr 1576, Edward's eldest son, denounced his family name to become a minister at the Wooster Chapel. He married Rebecca (Kynge) Worcester, with whom he had nine children. William died at the age of 47 on 20 Nov 1623 in Cheddington, Buckingham.
Henry Somerset, 5th Earl of Worcester, his heir and successor, who was later created the 1st Marquess of Worcester;
Thomas Somerset, 1st Viscount Somerset (Peerage of Ireland), who was born in 1579, died in 1649; he was created Viscount Somerset on 8 December 1626; in 1616 he married Helen Barry – her third marriage -, with whom he had one daughter:
Elizabeth Somerset, who might have died young, but that is unsure;
Lady Catherine or Katherine Somerset, who died on 6 November 1654 and, before 14 January 1607, married Thomas Windsor, 6th Baron Windsor, with whom she had no issue; and
Lady Blanche Somerset, who died 28 October 1649, and married Thomas Arundell, 2nd Baron Arundell of Wardour, with whom she had one son and two daughters, his only children; the settlement for this marriage was on 11 May 1607.
Lady Frances Somerset, wife of William Morgan, esquire of Llantarnam and mother of Edward Morgan (c. 1612 – 24 June 1653), who was the great-great grandfather of Daniel Boone.
 Sir Charles Somerset (1587/8 – 1665), traveller and writer, Knight of the Bath.
 Lady Elizabeth Somerset, married Sir Henry Guildford.
 Lady Katherine Somerset (1575-1624), married William Petre, 2nd Baron Petre.

Four of his daughters danced as the rivers of Monmouthshire in the court masque Tethys' Festival on 5 June 1610; Lady Catherine Windsor as the "Nymph of Usk"; Lady Katherine Petre as the "Nymph of Olwy"; Lady Elizabeth Guildford as the "Nymph of Dulesse"; and Lady Mary Wintour as the "Nymph of Wye".

Somerset is buried in the family chapel in the Church of St Cadoc, Raglan, Monmouthshire

Ancestry

References

16th-century births
1628 deaths
06
Earls Marshal
Knights of the Garter
Lord High Constables of England
Lord-Lieutenants of Glamorgan
Lord-Lieutenants of Monmouthshire
Lords Privy Seal
16th-century English nobility
E
06
17th-century English nobility